Dastidar is a surname. Notable people with the surname include:

Jayanta Dastidar (born 1973), Indian former cricketer
Kakoli Ghosh Dastidar (born 1959), Indian politician
Purnendu Dastidar (1909–1971), Bengali politician, writer and lawyer
Sudarshan Ghosh Dastidar, Indian politician
Tarakeswar Dastidar (d. 1934), Indian independence activist